Peter Šaraškin (born 2 November 1967) is an Estonian sailor. He competed at the 1996 Summer Olympics and the 2000 Summer Olympics.

References

External links
 

1967 births
Living people
Estonian male sailors (sport)
Olympic sailors of Estonia
Sailors at the 1996 Summer Olympics – Laser
Sailors at the 2000 Summer Olympics – Laser
Sportspeople from Tallinn